Margaux Hackett (born 2 June 1999) is a New Zealand freestyle skier who competes internationally. She represented New Zealand in the slopestyle and big air events at the 2022 Winter Olympics in Beijing, China.

Biography 
Hackett was born and raised in Annecy, France, to a New Zealand father, adventure tourism entrepreneur A. J. Hackett, and a French mother. She learnt to ski when she was four years old and, as a child, joined an alpine ski club in the French Alps.

Hackett is based in Wānaka during the New Zealand winter and Manigod, France, during the Northern Hemisphere winter. She is coached by Snow Sports New Zealand high-performance freeski coach Hamish McDougall.

References

Living people
1999 births
New Zealand female freestyle skiers
Olympic freestyle skiers of New Zealand
Freestyle skiers at the 2022 Winter Olympics